is a Japanese animation studio founded on May 1, 2014. The studio was founded by former Anime International Company (AIC) animation producer and editor Takashi Sakurai. Some of the studio's employees include ex-members from AIC's post-production department.

Works

Television series

Original video animations

Original net animations

References

External links

 

 
Japanese companies established in 2014
Animation studios in Tokyo
Japanese animation studios
Mass media companies established in 2014